Naples Will Never Die (Italian: Napoli che non muore) is a 1939 Italian comedy film directed by Amleto Palermi and starring Fosco Giachetti, Marie Glory and Paola Barbara. A young French tourist on holiday in Naples meets and falls in love with an engineer. She marries him, but finds his family overbearing and traditional while they consider her to be too extrovert. She leaves him and returns to France, but the couple are eventually re-united.

Cast
 Fosco Giachetti as Mario Fusco 
 Marie Glory as Annie Fusco 
 Paola Barbara as Teresa 
 Bella Starace Sainati as Donna Amalia Fusco 
 Cesare Bettarini as Pietro 
 Carla Sveva as Lia 
 Ennio Cerlesi as Enrico 
 Armando Migliari as Daspuro 
 Clelia Matania as Rosinella 
 Giuseppe Porelli as Il maestro Califano 
 Gianni Agus as Bebè 
 Vittorio Parisi as Il cantate

References

Bibliography 
 Gundle, Stephen. Mussolini's Dream Factory: Film Stardom in Fascist Italy. Berghahn Books, 2013.
 Liehm, Mira. Passion and Defiance: Film in Italy from 1942 to the Present. University of California Press, 1984.

External links 
 

1939 films
Italian romantic comedy films
Italian black-and-white films
1939 romantic comedy films
1930s Italian-language films
Films directed by Amleto Palermi
Films set in Naples
Films scored by Alessandro Cicognini
1930s Italian films